Davis Rules is an American sitcom broadcast on ABC in 1991 and on CBS in 1992. The series was produced by Carsey-Werner Productions.

Synopsis
The series stars Randy Quaid as Dwight Davis, a widowed elementary school principal who is raising his three sons (Robbie, Charlie, and Ben) with the help of his wacky father Gunny Davis (Jonathan Winters).

Cast
 Randy Quaid as Dwight Davis
 Jonathan Winters as Gunny Davis
 Trevor Bullock as Robbie Davis (season 1)
 Luke Edwards as Charlie Davis
 Nathan Watt as Ben Davis
 Patricia Clarkson as Cosmo Yeargin (season 1)
 Rigoberto Jimenez as Rigo Cordona (season 1)
 Tamayo Otsuki as Mrs. Elaine Yamagami
 Debra Mooney as Mrs. Rush
 Debra Jo Rupp as Ms. Higgins (season 1)
 Vonni Ribisi as Skinner Buckley (season 2)
 Bonnie Hunt as Gwen Davis (season 2)

Production
Davis Rules was canceled by ABC after less than one season despite having premiered after Super Bowl XXV. ABC retained the rights to the series and planned to use it as a midseason replacement. When the series wasn't used in ABC's lineup, CBS bought the series in November 1991.

CBS retooled the series, adding Bonnie Hunt and Giovanni Ribisi (credited as Vonni Ribisi), but canceled it after 16 episodes.

Episodes

Series overview

Season 1 (1991)
Every episode of season 1 was directed by Ellen Falcon.

Season 2 (1991–92)
The first thirteen episodes of season 2 were directed by James Widdoes, while the final three episodes were directed by John Bowab.

Awards and nominations
Winters won an Emmy for his role as Gunny Davis, while Trevor Bullock and Robin Lynn Heath also won Young Artist Awards for their roles in the series.

References

External links
 Davis Rules @ Carsey-Werner
 
 

1991 American television series debuts
1992 American television series endings
1990s American sitcoms
American Broadcasting Company original programming
CBS original programming
English-language television shows
Primetime Emmy Award-winning television series
Television series about families
Television series by Carsey-Werner Productions
Super Bowl lead-out shows
American television series revived after cancellation
 Television shows set in Seattle